Under My Skin is the sixth studio album by English singer and songwriter Gabrielle. It was released on 17 August 2018 via BMG Rights Management, her first studio record in 11 years since 2007's Always. Two singles have been released from the album; the lead single, "Show Me", was released on 26 April 2018. The second single "Shine", was released on 6 July 2018.

Gabrielle launched the new record with a sold-out show at London's Jazz Café on 8 May 2018.

Reception
In a 3 out of 5 star review, Dave Simpson of The Guardian referred to the album as "a heartfelt comeback" that "makes it seem as if she never went away" and added that "the glossy pop-soul production is as catchy as her smashes" but that several songs "would be self-help manual material if they weren’t so passionately, sincerely sung". He concluded by explaining that "while more grit in the butter wouldn’t have gone amiss, Under My Skin returns to the sound that made Gabrielle famous".

Track listing

Personnel
Adapted from qobuz

Gabrielle – vocals, backing vocals, composition
Ian Barter – production, drums, guitar, bass guitar, keyboards, record engineering, composition
Steve Chrisanthou – composition, production, guitar, bass guitar, mixing engineering, record engineering
Tim Larsson – composition, production, piano, mix engineer, record engineering
Tobias Lundgren – composition, production, guitar, mix engineering, record engineering
Louise Hull – backing vocals
Christian Burns – backing vocals
Jennifer Kästel – backing vocals
Jay Reynolds – mix engineering
Guy Massey – mix engineering
Dick Beetham – master engineering
Chris Smith – drums
Paul Siddall – keyboards
Tim Kellet – brass
Andy Thornton – bass guitar

Charts

Release history

References

2018 albums
Gabrielle (singer) albums
BMG Rights Management albums